Now That's What I Call Music! 32 was released on November 3, 2009. The album is the 32nd edition of the (U.S.) Now! series. For the first time, the series includes a track by an artist as part of its "What's Next New Music Preview" feature, Katharine McPhee's "Had It All".

Now 32 debuted at number five on the Billboard 200 with nearly 102,000 copies sold. As of the week ending June 6, 2010, the album has sold 908,000 copies.

Now 32 contains three songs that reached number one on the Billboard Hot 100: "I Gotta Feeling", "Down", and "Whatcha Say".

Track listing

Downloadable content
Now! 32 offered free downloadable MP3s through November 4, 2010, for those purchasing the CD. Included in this volume are the following artists and songs:

 The Cataracs – "Club Love"
 Tyrone Wells – "More"
 Hedley – "Don't Talk to Strangers"
 Ron Pope – "A Drop in the Ocean"
 Black Dada – "Imma Zoe"
 Erik Hassle – "Hurtful" (Acoustic)
 Lolene – "Sexy People"
 Jaicko – "Oh Yeah"

Charts

Weekly charts

Year-end charts

References

External links
 Official U.S. Now That's What I Call Music website

2009 compilation albums
 032
Sony Music compilation albums